Consumer Watchdog is a division of Business & Enterprise Solutions Botswana (Pty) Ltd, a privately owned company registered in Botswana and based in Gaborone.

With newspaper columns in both the national daily newspaper Mmegi and the country's best-selling newspaper The Voice every Friday, as well as a blog, Consumer Watchdog has a wide reach regarding consumer issues in Botswana.

Originally set up in 2004, Watchdog has the following stated aims:
 To campaign for legislation to protect the consumer
 To represent consumers and advocate on their behalf
 To make service providers in Botswana accountable
 To educate consumers about their choices, their rights, their responsibilities

Services delivered by BES, the parent company of Consumer Watchdog, include customer service training, organisational review and mystery shopping.

On 31 May 2007, Consumer Watchdog celebrated its second birthday party, with the President of Botswana Festus Mogae as guest of honour.  180 customer service champions were celebrated in front of the president, the press and the people.

Consumer Watchdog representatives have worked widely with companies in Botswana and southern Africa, including major banks in Botswana. 
They also work with the government, insurance companies, retail outlets and restaurants.

References

External links
 Official website
 Consumer Watchdog blog

Economy of Botswana
Organisations based in Botswana
Consumer organizations based in Africa